The 1968–69 snooker season, the first season of the modern era of snooker, was a series of snooker tournaments played between July 1968 and March 1969. The following table outlines the results for the season's events.


Calendar

New professionals
The following players turned professional during the season: Maureen Baynton, Maurice Parkin David Taylor, Bernard Bennett, and Graham Miles

Notes

References

1968
1968 in snooker
1969 in snooker